The Communicators for Women Religious (CWR) is a professional association of personnel responsible for communications within religious congregations of women. Currently, CWR has 205 members.

CWR was formed in 1993 under the previous title of National Communicators Network for Women Religious (NCNWR).

Organization
CWR is a not-for-profit organization with a 501(c)(3) status that is governed by its membership through an international board of directors. CWR provides a professional network to support its members and conducts annual conferences in cities around the United States and will hold its first conference in Canada in 2017. An executive director was hired in 2016 to facilitate the implementation of the Mission and Vision and to be the face of the organization both internally and externally. A coordinator handles administrative affairs and serves as a liaison to the members and the board.

Mission
Communicators for Women Religious is an international professional organization of those responsible for communications within religious congregations of women. As a network of professionals, CWR provides members with the communication tools necessary to promote understanding of women religious, enhance their image and advance their mission; is a leader, providing direction and resources, in the area of communications for organizations serving women religious; and is a resource for media and the wider public about the diversity and changing role of women religious in the 21st Century. Our associate members advance the mission of Catholic Sisters in other capacities.

History
In April 1993, three communicators for congregations of women religious gathered in Adrian, Mich., to explore ways of networking. From this small beginning, CWR (formerly NCNWR - National Communicators Network for Women Religious) has grown to more than 200 members representing more than 150 religious congregations in the United States, Canada, Ireland, Italy and Australia. These lay and religious communicators are the voice of thousands of religious women throughout the world. NCNWR was incorporated in the state of Illinois in 2006, and 10 years later it established its first physical office at Catholic Theological Union in Chicago.

External links
 – CWR website for professional communicators

Associate members of CWR include the Leadership Conference of Women Religious, the National Religious Vocation Conference, A Nun's Life Ministry, the International Union of Superiors General, the Dominican Sisters Conference, the Southdown Institute, SOAR! (Support Our Aging Religious) and the Religious Formation Conference.

Women's organizations based in the United States
Professional associations based in the United States
Marketing organizations